The Ruwer is a river in Germany with a length of . It is a right tributary of the Moselle. The valley of the Ruwer is a part of the Moselle wine-growing region near Trier in the state of Rhineland-Palatinate. It is famous for its Riesling wines, see Ruwer (region), and, prior to 1 August 2007, the Moselle region used to be known as Moselle-Saar-Ruwer.

In the lower Ruwer valley are the villages of Waldrach, Kasel, Mertesdorf, Eitelsbach and Ruwer.

History 
The Roman city of Trier (Augusta Treverorum) was supplied with water by the Roman Ruwer Aqueduct, which delivered up to 25,000 cubic metres per day.

In A.D. 371, the Ruwer was mentioned by the Roman poet, Ausonius, in his poem, Mosella as follows: "The Ruwer turns the corn-grinding millstones in giddy whirls and draws the shrieking saws through smooth marble blocks."

Tributaries

Other tributaries of the Ruwer include the Apfelbach, Borgraben, Eitelsbach, Gusterather Waschbach, Kundelbach, Labach, Moertschelbach, Rimperterbach, Wenigbach, Wenzelbach and the Wilzenburger Waschbach.

Mills 
There are, or were, several water mills in the Ruwer region:
Alte Mühle Kell am See,
Mühlscheider Hof in Kahlbach,
Schillingen Mill Lehbach,
Niederkell Mill,
Unterste Mühle at Burkelsbach,
Saw mill at Burkelsbach,
Waldweiler Mill,
Niederzerfer Mill on the Ruwer,
Hauser Mill on the Ruwer,
Mill at Großbach in Zerf,
Kramesmühle Hentern,
Hentern Mill,
Lampaden Mill at Reiperter Bach,
Benrath Mill at Klinkbach,
Burg Heid Mill,
Hinzenburg Mill,
Heddert Mill on the Rauruwer,
Little Geizenburg Mill,
Pluwiger Hammer,
Mill at Enterbach,
Raulsmühle near Lonzenburg,
Mill in Sommerau and another mill,
Korlingen Mill,
Herrgottsmühle (Morscheid Mill),
Studentenmühle,
Lichtenthalsmühle,
Schleifmühle at the Riveris mouth in Waldrach,
Schmelzmühle Waldrach, Schneidemühle Riveris, Feilensmühle Riveris, Osburger Mühle on the Riveris,
Alte Dorfmühle Waldrach (Scherfsmühle),
Ölmühle,
Welschmühle Waldrach,
Mills in Kasel,
Karlsmühle Mertesdorf, Reisenmühle,
Grünhäuser Mill,
Hüstermühle Trier-Ruwer,
Lambertysmühle, Felsenmühle,
etc.

Biology 
In and by the Ruwer live numerous rare and protected species, such as the bullhead, dipperl, purple emperor butterfly and the kingfisher.
Until the 1940s, salmons were still caught in the Ruwer.

See also
List of rivers of Rhineland-Palatinate

References

Rivers of Rhineland-Palatinate
Rivers of the Hunsrück
Rivers of Germany